The 2021–22 season of the Hoofdklasse will be played in four leagues, two for Saturday and two for Sunday. The champions of each league will be promoted directly to the Derde Divisie; other teams can get promoted through play-offs. The 2021–22 Hoofdklasse will start on Saturday 28 August 2021.

Play-offs

Promotion 
In each competition teams play periods of 10 games, three times per season (30 games per season). After each period the best team which has not yet qualified earns a spot in the play-offs for the Derde Divisie as the period champion. 6 teams from the Saturday Hoofdklasse play against 2 teams from the Saturday Derde Divisie for 2 promotion spots. The teams from the Sunday leagues do the same.

Relegation 
The teams in place 13 and 14 at the end of the season fight against relegation in the relegation play-offs. They face the period champions of the Eerste Klasse.

Saturday A

Teams

Standings

Fixtures/results

Saturday B

Teams

Standings

Fixtures/results

Sunday A

Teams

Standings

Fixtures/results

Sunday B

Teams

Standings

Fixtures/results

References 

Vierde Divisie seasons
Hoofdklasse
Netherlands